"Where Do Broken Hearts Go" is a song recorded by American singer  Whitney Houston for her second studio album, Whitney (1987). It was released as the fourth single from the album on February 25, 1988. The song was written by Frank Wildhorn and Chuck Jackson and produced by Narada Michael Walden. Due to Wildhorn's previous working relationship with Arista Records CEO Clive Davis, he had been approached about potentially writing for Houston. He contacted Jackson, who came up with the title, after which Wildhorn completed the music and lyrics for the song. Smokey Robinson originally wanted to record the song; however, Wildhorn and Jackson held the song for Houston.

Wildhorn recalls about the song's selection for the album:"From what I understand, it was one of the first songs chosen for the album. Knowing [it was for] Whitney's project, there must have been 50,000 songs submitted after (ours). So every week it was, 'Do we still have it?' We were going through hell."Initially, Houston did not want to record the song, feeling there was no special message to convey. In a 2000 interview, Houston reminisced that she "hated the song". However, Davis believed the song would go to number one if she recorded it, so she agreed. It indeed became a number one, Houston's seventh consecutive number-one single in the United States—a record for consecutive number-one singles that still stands to this day.

Critical reception
AllMusic's Ron Wynn highlighted the track in his review of the Whitney album. Robert Hilburn of the Los Angeles Times described it as a ballad "that raises questions without making you care about the answers." People Magazine said that songs like "Where Do Broken Hearts Go" "have some substance". Pop Rescue noted it as a "classic big 80s power ballad", adding it as "the perfect ending to a school disco."

Chart performance
"Where Do Broken Hearts Go", released off Whitney as the fourth single in February 1988, debuted at number 47 on the Billboard Hot 100 Singles chart in the issue dated February 27, 1988. Within four weeks of its release the single reached the top ten on the chart, and finally peaked at number one in the issue dated April 23, 1988 after nine weeks on the chart, making Houston the only artist in pop history with seven consecutive number-one hits. In addition, she became the first female artist to achieve four number-one singles from one album, Whitney. To date, only four other albums by women have yielded four Hot 100 number-one hits; Paula Abdul's Forever Your Girl in 1988, Janet Jackson's Rhythm Nation 1814 in 1989, Mariah Carey's self-titled debut in 1990 and Katy Perry's Teenage Dream in 2010. Houston also had the most number-one hits (7) by a female artist in the 1980s, a feat equaled only by Madonna. The song topped the chart for two weeks, and spent 18 weeks on the chart. It entered the Billboard R&B/Hip-Hop Songs chart (formerly "Hot Black Singles") at number 60, the issue date of March 5, 1988 and nine weeks later reached a peak of number two (behind "Nite and Day" by Al B. Sure!), becoming Houston's ninth R&B top five hit. On the Billboard Hot Adult Contemporary chart, the single peaked at number one, the issue dated April 2, 1988, and remained there for three weeks, making it her sixth No. 1 single on the chart. It was ranked number 33 and 47, on the Billboard Top Pop and Top Black Singles year-end charts for 1988, respectively. The single also placed at number two on the Top Adult Contemporary Singles year-end chart of the same year. In Canada, the song entered RPM Top 100 Singles chart at number 76, the issue date of March 5, 1988, and peaked at number six on the chart on May 14, 1988, becoming Houston's eighth top ten hit in the country.

Worldwide, "Where Do Broken Hearts Go" was not as commercially successful as her previous singles from the album Whitney. The single debuted at number 30 on the UK Singles Chart, the week ending date of March 12, 1988, and three weeks later reached a peak of number 14 on the chart. In Ireland, it peaked at number two, the highest chart position of the song outside the United States. The song also reached number 48 in Australia, number 47 in the Netherlands, and number 23 in New Zealand.
The song was very popular in the Philippines, and it became one of the main focus of the 2014 indie romantic film That Thing Called Tadhana.

Music video
The music video (directed by Peter Israelson) features Houston breaking up with a boyfriend and reflecting on happy memories; asking herself the title question, "where do broken hearts go?" At the conclusion of the music video, the couple reunites.

Houston is depicted in various "glamour girl" shots throughout the video; Arista executives reportedly joked at the time, "there's her screen test", referring to rumors about Houston's Hollywood ambitions.  In 2002, Israelson told Liquid Assets, a British TV documentary series focused on the net worth of celebrities, that Houston's performance in the video's 1940s-themed train station scene (filmed at Newark Penn Station) convinced Kevin Costner of her acting abilities for The Bodyguard.

The video was moderately controversial since the ambiguous ethnic background of Houston's love interest (reportedly Houston's then real-life love interest, New York restaurateur Brad Johnson) highlighted the racial sensitivities that accompanied Houston's success during the 1980s. The singer had been criticized for "selling out" and "acting white". A mostly-black audience jeered when "Where Do Broken Hearts Go" was nominated for an award at the 1989 Soul Train Music Awards.

Live performances
Houston first performed "Where Do Broken Hearts Go" at Montreux Golden Rose Rock Festival on May 15, 1987. The performance was broadcast later in the US, as well as on various European TV channels. Houston sang the song at The 15th American Music Awards, held on January 25, 1988.  She lip-synced to the album version of the song on the UK BBC1 TV show Wogan, which was hosted by Terry Wogan in 1988. "Where Do Broken Hearts Go" was one of the Houston's set list during Nelson Mandela 70th Birthday Celebration concert, televised live worldwide via BBC, at Wembley Stadium in London on June 11, 1988. In the US, the edit version of the concert was broadcast later on Fox TV network.

Aside from the several live televised performances, the song was included on the set-lists on Houston's four tours, usually serving as part of a love song medley along with her other ballad hits. During her Moment of Truth World Tour (1987–88), the performance of the song was a little different to the album version. She started the song to usual tempo and was completed the song in an extended coda vamp, used her chest voice and falsetto appropriately. On her Feels So Right Japan Tour in 1990 and I'm Your Baby Tonight World Tour in 1991, Houston performed the song as the final part of a love song medley with "All at Once," "Didn't We Almost Have It All" and "A House Is Not a Home." She sang the additional lyrics such as "take me in your arms" and "say that you love me" extemporaneously at the end of the song. During I'm Your Baby Tonight World Tour, Houston performed the love song medley with the song at Welcome Home Heroes with Whitney Houston concert, dedicated to the US troops, their families in honor of those returning from the Gulf War, which was broadcast live via HBO on March 31, 1991. Similarly, during The Bodyguard World Tour (1993–94), "Where Do Broken Hearts Go" was used as the fourth part of a love song medley, which included "Nobody Loves Like You Do" and "All the Man That I Need." In 1998, on Houston's 10-dates European Tour, she also delivered a performance of the song as the final part of a love song medley.

Track listing and formats

US, 7" vinyl single
A1: "Where Do Broken Hearts Go" – 4:37
B1: "Where You Are" – 4:10

US, 12" vinyl single
A:  "Where Do Broken Hearts Go" – 4:29
B1: "Where You Are" – 4:10
B2: "Didn't We Almost Have It All" (Dub Mix) – 7:45

US, Cassette single
A: "Where Do Broken Hearts Go" – 4:37
B: "Where You Are" – 4:10

UK, 12" vinyl single
A:  "Where Do Broken Hearts Go" – 4:37
B1: "If You Say My Eyes Are Beautiful" (Duet with Jermaine Jackson) – 4:19
B2: "Where You Are" – 4:10

Japan, 7" vinyl single
A: "Where Do Broken Hearts Go" – 4:37
B: "Where You Are" – 4:10

Europe, CD single
 "Where Do Broken Hearts Go" – 4:37
 "Where You Are" – 4:10
 "Didn't We Almost Have It All" (Live Version) – 7:45

Charts and certifications

Weekly charts

Year-end charts

Certifications

Credits and personnel

"Where Do Broken Hearts Go"
Whitney Houston – vocals
Narada Michael Walden – drum programming
Frank Martin – piano, synths
Preston "Tiger Head" Glass – synth programming, bells
Randy "The King" Jackson – bass synth
Corrado Rustici – guitar synth
Greg "Gigi" Gonaway – Simmons
Michael Gibbs – string arrangements, conductor
Jim Gilstrap, Karen "Kitty Beethoven" Brewington, Niki Haris, Jennifer Hall - background vocals

"If You Say My Eyes Are Beautiful"
Whitney Houston – vocals
Jermaine Jackson – vocals
Elliot Willensky – writer
Tom Keane – producer
Jermaine Jackson – producer

"Where You Are"
Whitney Houston – vocals
Dyan Humes – writer
Lemel Humes – writer
James Calabres – writer
Kashif – producer

See also
List of Hot 100 number-one singles of 1988 (U.S.)
List of number-one adult contemporary singles of 1988 (U.S.)

References

External links
Where Do Broken Hearts Go at Discogs

Whitney Houston songs
1980s ballads
1987 songs
1988 singles
Billboard Hot 100 number-one singles
Cashbox number-one singles
Contemporary R&B ballads
Pop ballads
Songs written by Frank Wildhorn
Song recordings produced by Narada Michael Walden
1986 songs
Arista Records singles
Songs about heartache
Quiet storm songs
Torch songs